"In the Groove" by pianist and arranger Mary Lou Williams (1910-1981) is a classic big band jazz composition. The Kansas City-based band Andy Kirk and His Twelve Clouds of Joy gained brief national following largely through the efforts of its principal arranger, pianist Mary Lou Williams, who had a formative role in the Kansas City jazz tradition. The title gave wider currency for a jazz musician's expression.

Jazz compositions
Jazz standards
Year of song missing